Gryann Mendoza (born September 9, 1990) is a Filipino professional basketball player for the TNT Tropang Giga of the Philippine Basketball Association (PBA) and is currently assigned to TNT Tropang Giga 3x3 of the PBA 3x3 . He was undrafted and signed by the Hotshots in 2016.

PBA career statistics

As of the end of 2021 season

Season-by-season averages
 
|-
| align=left | 
| align=left | Star
| 11 || 4.6 || .455 || .667 || .400 || .5 || .4 || .0 || .0 || 2.2
|-
| align=center | 
| align=left | Magnolia
| 15 || 4.1 || .395 ||  .267 || .429 || .7 || .4 || .0 || .1 || 2.5
|-
| align=left | 
| align=left | TNT
| 12 || 3.7 || .364 || .222 || .250 || .3 || .3 || .1 || .0 || 1.6
|-class=sortbottom
| align="center" colspan=2 | Career
| 38 || 4.1 || .402 || .296 || .375 || .5 || .4 || .0 || .0 || 2.1

References

1990 births
Living people
Filipino men's basketball players
Magnolia Hotshots players
Shooting guards
Small forwards
FEU Tamaraws basketball players
Basketball players from Davao City
TNT Tropang Giga players
Filipino men's 3x3 basketball players
PBA 3x3 players